A list of Professional Mountain Bikers.

Visionaries
 Keith Bontrager
 Joe Breeze
 Charlie Cunningham
 Gary Fisher
 Charlie Kelly
 Jacquie Phelan
 Tom Ritchey
 John Tomac

Cross Country
 Julien Absalon (Team BMC)
 Henrique Avancini (Cannondale Factory Team)
 Warren Carne (huffy factory team)
 Gunn-Rita Dahle Flesjå
 Susan DeMattei
 Alison Dunlap
 Manuel Fumic (Cannondale Factory Team)
 Juli Furtado
 Sam Gaze (Specialized)
 Sue Haywood
 Gerhard Kerschbaumer (Torpado)
 Maxime Marotte (Cannondale Factory Team)
 Jolanda Neff (Trek Factory)
 Ned Overend (Specialized)
 Paola Pezzo
 Jacquie Phelan
 Nino Schurter (Team Scott)
 Stephane Tempier (Trek Factory)
  David Wiens

Downhill Racers
 Gee Atherton (Atherton bikes)
 Rachel Atherton (Atherton bikes)
 Scott Beaumont 
 Loïc Bruni (Specialized S-works)
 Jackson Goldstone  (Santa cruz)
 Eric Carter 
 Anne-Caroline Chausson (Turner)
 Missy Giove
 Cedric Gracia (CG Racing Brigade/Santa Cruz)
 Jared Graves (Yeti Cycles)
 Aaron Gwin (YT Industry)
 Tracey Hannah (Hutchinson United)
 Danny Hart (Mondraker)
 Greg Herbold
 Sam Hill (cyclist) (Nukeproof/Chain Reaction Cycles)
 Charlie Kelly (malvern star)
 Chris Kovarik (Nukeproof/Chain Reaction Cycles)
 Matti Lehikoinen (Intense/Chain Reaction Cycles)
 Tara Llanes
 Brian Lopes (Ibis)
 Mark Matthews
 Greg Minnaar (Santa Cruz Syndicate)
 Shaun Palmer (Intense)
 Steve Peat (Santa Cruz Syndicate)
 Jacquie Phelan
 Filip Polc (Evil MS-Racing)
 Tom Ritchey
 Joey Schusler
 John Tomac (Tomac)
 Nicolas Vouilloz (Lapierre/BOS)
 Rob Warner
 Nathan Rennie (Santa Cruz Syndicate)

Trials Riders
Elijah Dabas (polygon)
Martyn Ashton
Kenny Belaey 
Jack Carthy
Gilles Coustellier
Vincent Hermance
Danny MacAskill (Santa Cruz)
Abel Mustieles
Hans Rey (GT)

Dirt Jumpers/ Freeriders
 Darren Berrecloth (Canyon)
 Robbie Bourdon (Intense)
 Ryan Howard (Trek)
 Matt Hunter (Specialized)
 Andreu Lacondeguy (Commencal)
 Anthony Messere (Morpheus/Red Bull)
 Sam Reynolds (Polygon Bikes)
 Brett Rheeder (Trek)
 Nicholi Rogatkin (Specialized)
 Brandon Semenuk (Trek)
 Wade Simmons (Rocky Mountain)
 Martin Söderström (Specialized/Red Bull)
 Kurt Sorge (Evil Bikes)
 Cameron Zink (YT/Monster Energy)

Top mountain bike coaches
 Gene Hamilton
 Andrew Shandro (Trek)

 
Lists of cyclists